The Fasken Center is a complex of two  high-rise buildings in the downtown business district of Midland, Texas.

The first tower was built in 1974 with fourteen floors. In 1982, the second tower was constructed to mirror the first tower. It, too, has fourteen floors. The Fasken Center is sometimes referred to by locals as the Twin Towers of Midland. Many oil and gas companies are tenants of the buildings, as well as a bank.

References

http://n.b5z.net/i/u/10000471/i/Fasken_Center.pdf

Twin towers
Skyscraper office buildings in Midland, Texas
1974 establishments in Texas
Office buildings completed in 1974